Buck Creek is a tributary of the Delaware River, rising in Lower Makefield Township, Bucks County, Pennsylvania and meeting its confluence at the Delaware River's 138.00 river mile.

Statistics
Buck Creek was entered into the Geographic Names Information System of the U.S. Geological Survey on 2 August 1979 as identification number 1170509, U.S. Department of the Interior Geological Survey I.D. is 02944.

Course

Municipalities
Bucks County
Lower Makefield Township
Yardley Borough

Crossings and Bridges

See also
List of rivers of Pennsylvania
List of rivers of the United States
List of Delaware River tributaries

References

Rivers of Bucks County, Pennsylvania
Rivers of Pennsylvania
Tributaries of the Delaware River